The Winslow Homer Studio is the historic studio and home of the artist Winslow Homer, which is located on what is now Winslow Homer Road on Prouts Neck in Scarborough, Maine. Maine architect John Calvin Stevens altered and expanded an existing carriage house to suit Homer's needs in 1884, even moving the building 100 feet for added privacy from his brother's neighboring summer home. The most dramatic element is a balcony the width of the building, from which the artist often painted in winter. Homer lived and painted in the studio from 1884 until his death there in 1910.

The studio was declared a National Historic Landmark in 1965.

The Portland Museum of Art acquired the building and surrounding grounds on January 31, 2006, closing both to the public during restoration projects. It was opened to the public in 2012, but may only be visited on a guided tour. The Portland Museum of Art undertook significant restoration of the building. Changes and additions made by members of the Homer family in 1938–39 were undone in order to preserve the studio as Winslow Homer left it in 1910. Some updates were also made to the property to enable it to function as a museum exhibit. The additions included plumbing and a restroom for visitors, electricity, security, and hidden steel reinforcements for the balcony (or piazza).

See also
List of National Historic Landmarks in Maine
National Register of Historic Places listings in Cumberland County, Maine

References

External links

Portland Museum of Art: Winslow Homer Studio
Winslow Homer Studio Restoration
Winslow Homer Studio Restoration (pdf)

Houses completed in 1884
National Historic Landmarks in Maine
Houses in Cumberland County, Maine
Artists' studios in the United States
Tourist attractions in Cumberland County, Maine
Buildings and structures in Scarborough, Maine
Museums in Cumberland County, Maine
Historic house museums in Maine
National Register of Historic Places in Cumberland County, Maine